The Swiss Space Office (SSO) is the federal government's competence centre for national and international space matters. In its role it cooperates closely with other federal offices and is responsible for the preparation and implementation of the policy and strategic orientations of the space domain in Switzerland. The SSO is part of the State Secretariat for Education, Research, and Innovation. The Head of the SSO is Dr. Renato Krpoun.

The SSO ensures international cooperation in the space sector and promotes contacts with foreign partners. It represents Swiss interests in international organisations and international cooperation programmes. The most important instrument for implementing Swiss space policy is the participation of Switzerland in European Space Agency (ESA) programmes and activities. State Secretary Prof. Dr. Martina Hirayama and Dr. Renato Krpoun lead the delegation to ESA at ministerial, respectively delegate level.

Switzerland is a founding member of the European Space Agency, and has actively participated in European space development since 1960. The Swiss Space Office opened in 1998. The role of the SSO expanded to cover all aspects of space policy in 2000, when the new national constitution came into force.

According to Jane's, the SSO is "the administrative unit charged with planning and implementing Swiss space policy", which was defined by the Swiss Federal Council. The SSO office in Bern includes the Federal Commission for Space Affairs (CFAS), and the Interdepartmental Coordination Committee for Space Affairs (IKAR).

Claude Nicollier is a Swiss Astronaut and has been on several missions with the United States space program in the 1990s and is also a member of the European Astronaut Corps. By 2007 he had retired from Swiss space missions to become a professor at EPFL. Switzerland's Marc Bertschi became the head of the ESA launcher program in 2007.

Manned space missions
U.S.-Swiss Space Shuttle missions:

 STS-46 in 1992. European Retrievable Carrier EURECA Atlantis
 STS-61 in 1993. Hubble Servicing Mission 2 Endeavour
 STS-75 in 1996. TSS-1R Italian mission Columbia
 STS-103 in 1999. Hubble Servicing Mission 3A Discovery

Swiss space technology

Selected examples of Swiss contributions to space exploration and technology.

 Omega Speedmaster, worn by Buzz Aldrin on the moon, and standard equipment for NASA astronauts.
 Solar sail developed at University of Bern used by the Apollo Program to measure solar wind on moon.
 ESA Ariane rocket uses Swiss RUAG Space payload fairings.
 Genesis probe sample return analyzed at Federal Institute of Technology at Zurich.
 NASA Mars Pathfinder rover used Swiss Maxon motors.
 University of Neuchatel contributed to the Mars Phoenix (spacecraft).
 University of Bern developed an ultra stable light source for testing NASA's TESS space telescope.
 CHEOPS (CHaracterising ExOPlanets Satellite) space telescope developed at the University of Bern.
 The Colour and Stereo Surface Imaging System (CaSSIS) is a high-resolution, 4.5 m per pixel (15 ft/pixel), colour stereo camera on board ESA's Trace Gas Orbiter developed at the University of Bern.

Offices
Headquarters, CFAS, and IKAR: Bern
Delegation to the European Space Agency: Paris
Delegation to ESA at the European Union: Brussels

Budget
In 2006, Switzerland contributed CHF 140 million ($142 million) or around 3.4% to ESA's budget. In 2005, the Swiss space industry's turnover was CHF 170 million.

See also 
 List of government space agencies
 Geneva Observatory
 Science and technology in Switzerland
 Zimmerwald Observatory

References

External links
 Webpage Swiss Space Office (English)
 Webpage Swiss Space Office (German)
 Webpage Swiss Space Office (French)
 Webpage Swiss Space Office (Italian)

Further reading
 Janes-Space-Systems-and-Industry: SSO

Space agencies